Crimson Skies is a board game that was published by FASA in 1998.

Gameplay
The Crimson Skies board game was released by FASA in 1998. The base game came with card stock, assemble-yourself airplanes included, but later metal miniature planes were offered separately.

Development
According to developer John Howard, development on the Crimson Skies board game was "literally an after hours effort" by a group of FASA employees organized by Jordan Weisman, resulting from the team's interest in the Crimson Skies universe.

Reception
The reviewer from the online second volume of Pyramid stated that "I thoroughly enjoy Crimson Skies, FASA's new board game of aerial combat. The combination of a unique game world and fast play have given me a new perspective about what everyone has been so keen on all this time".

The Crimson Skies board game won the Origins Awards for "Best Science Fiction or Fantasy Board Game" and "Best Graphic Presentation of a Board Game" of 1998.

Reviews
Backstab #14

References

FASA games
Miniature wargames
Origins Award winners
Science fiction board games
Wargames introduced in the 1990s